Trypeta tortile is a species of tephritid or fruit flies in the genus Trypeta of the family Tephritidae.

Distribution
Canada & United States.

References

tortile
Insects described in 1894
Diptera of North America